A Maldição do Sanpaku (also known as Sanpaku – O Olho da Ambição) is a 1991 Brazilian film directed by José Joffily. It stars Patrícia Pillar and Felipe Camargo.

Cast 
 Felipe Camargo .... Poeta
 Patrícia Pillar .... Cris
 Roberto Bomtempo .... Gafanhoto
 Sérgio Britto .... Velho
 Rogéria .... Loura
 Paulo Barbosa .... Negão
 Jonas Bloch .... Bruce
 Nelson Dantas .... Gold
 Carlos Gregório .... Sivuca
 Anselmo Vasconcelos
 Wilson Grey

Awards 
1991: Gramado Film Festival
Best Picture (Nominee)
Best Supporting Actor (Roberto Bomtempo) (won) 
Best Cinematography (Nonato Estrela) (won) 
Best Editing (Vera Freire) (won)

1992: Festival de Brasília
Best Picture (won)
Best Actress (Patrícia Pillar) (won)
Best Supporting Actor (Roberto Bomtempo) (won) 
Best Editing (Vera Freire) (won)

1994: São Paulo Association of Art Critics Awards
Best Actress (Patrícia Pillar) (won)
Best Editing (Vera Freire) (won)

References

External links 
 

1991 films
1990s Portuguese-language films
Brazilian drama films
1991 drama films